Rafikjon Sultonov (born 19 February 1988) is an Uzbek amateur boxer who competed at the 2008 Olympics at junior flyweight but was edged out by French southpaw Nordine Oubaali 7:8.

External links
 Bio

1988 births
Living people
Light-flyweight boxers
Olympic boxers of Uzbekistan
Boxers at the 2008 Summer Olympics
Boxers at the 2006 Asian Games
Uzbekistani male boxers
Asian Games competitors for Uzbekistan
Place of birth missing (living people)
21st-century Uzbekistani people